Roderick "Rigu" Bovingdon (born 28 September 1942) is an Anglo-Maltese Australian writer, academic, promoter of Maltese culture, social commentator, translator and musician.

Early life 
Roderick Bovingdon was born in Attard, Malta, on 28 September 1942 to Rebekka Debono and Henry Charles Bovingdon, an Englishman born in South Africa. The family emigrated from Malta by boat and disembarked on the shores of Woolloomooloo, Sydney, Australia on 14 January 1959, when he was 16 years old.

Career 

In 1968, Roderick Bovingdon founded the first School of Maltese Language outside of Malta.

in 1974, he played a key role in the initiation of a popular Maltese song festival in Australia.

National   for the Maltese Language 
He has written numerous opinion pieces and commentary criticizing the National Council for the Maltese Language's prescriptivist stance and dismissive approach to diasporic linguistic norms.

Council for Maltese Living Abroad 
In 2012, Tonio Borg, then-Deputy Prime Minister of Malta and Minister for Foreign Affairs of Malta, appointed Roderick Bovingdon to the Board of Experts as the Maltese community expert for Australia as part of the Council for Maltese Living Abroad, a council tasked with "keeping a registry of non-governmental organisations that were founded overseas by Maltese communities," among other initiatives and services for the Maltese diaspora.

Musical career 
In 1974, Rigu Bovingdon pioneered Maltese-language pop music outside Malta with the release of Bejn il-Ħbieb (Between friends), which was recorded in Sydney, Australia.

Għana singers Rigu Bovingdon and Joe Galea were featured in L’Imnarja, Fête des lumières (Malte), a 1983 documentary produced by the French National Center for Scientific Research (CNRS).

Personal life 
In 1965, he married Iris Pace. They have two sons.

Awards and honours 
On 13 October 2012, Bovingdon was named Honorary member of the Maltese Poets Association (in Maltese: Għaqda Poeti Maltin)

His 2015 book Laurent Ropà: L-Intellettwali Għawdxi-Franċiż was considered for the 2016 National Book Prize in the Historiographic Research category.

On 13 December 2018, he was awarded the Midalja għall-Qadi tar-Repubblika (Medal for Service to the Republic).

Discography 
 L-Aħħar Għana (Unknown, Cassette)
 Maltin u Għawdxin (1977, Vinyl)

Publications 
 1982 - Jekk
 1985 - Maltese Literature in Australia
 2001 - The Maltese Language of Australia - Maltraljan
 2009 - The Ballad of Truganini : Original Version and Translation from Maltese Il-ballata tat-Truganini
 2015 - Laurent Ropà: L-Intellettwali Għawdxi-Franċiż
 2019 - Maltralian : the Maltese ethnolect of Australia

See also 
 Maltralian
 Maltese Australians
 Maltese literature

References

External links 

 2019 interview on SBS about Aporija mill-Ġdid (in Maltese)
 2020 interview with Joe Axiaq about the development of the Maltese language in Australia (in Maltese)
 JOE GALEA & RIGU AND THE DIPLOMATS - Bejn il-Ħbieb (1976) on YouTube

Living people
Maltese-language writers from Australia
English-language writers from Malta
Italian-language writers from Australia
Italian-language writers from Malta
20th-century Australian poets
20th-century Maltese poets
Australian male poets
Maltese male poets
Australian academics
Linguists from Australia
Linguists from Malta
Australian musicians
Maltese musicians
Australian social commentators
Maltese social commentators
Australian translators
Maltese translators
Maltese–English translators
English–Maltese translators
Arabic–Maltese translators
French–Maltese translators
Greek–Maltese translators
Italian–Maltese translators
Maltese folk music
1942 births